Albifylline is a bio-active xanthine derivative.

External links
 Influence of pentoxifylline and albifylline on liver microcirculation and leukocyte adhesion after hemorrhagic shock in the rat.

Xanthines